Corrado Barazzutti (born 19 February 1953, in Udine) is a former tennis player from Italy. His career-high singles ranking was World No. 7, achieved in August 1978.

After his player career Barazzutti was non-playing captain of the Italy Davis Cup team and the Italy Fed Cup team. Since he has been captain, the Italian Fed Cup team have won the Fed Cup (now known as Billie Jean King Cup) four times: 2006, 2009, 2010 and 2013.

Career

As player
Barazzutti gained fame in 1971 by winning the Orange Bowl and the French Open Boys' Singles, and he turned professional in the same year. He had been called to the Italy Davis Cup team the previous year, an event which he played a total of 44 matches. In 1976, Barazzutti was a member of the Italian Davis Cup team who won the Davis Cup in Chile.

In Grand Slam tournaments, his best results are the semifinals in 1977 at the US Open and in 1978 at the French Open; he was beaten in straight sets by Jimmy Connors and Björn Borg respectively. Barazzutti won five career ATP tournaments.

Singles finals (5 titles, 8 runners-up)

As coach
In 2002 Barazzutti was appointed coach and, until 2017, non-player captain of the Fed Cup women's team. Under Barazzutti's guidance, the team has won the Fed Cup four times (2006, 2009, 2010, 2013). Until 2020 Barazzutti coached the men's Davis Cup too. In 2020 he coached for a brief period of time Italian tennis player Fabio Fognini.

See also
 Tennis in Italy

References

External links
 
 Officina del Tennis by Corrado Barazzutti 

1953 births
Living people
French Open junior champions
Italian male tennis players
Sportspeople from Udine
Grand Slam (tennis) champions in boys' singles
Italian tennis coaches